The 2020 Southeastern Louisiana Lions football team represented Southeastern Louisiana University in the 2020–21 NCAA Division I FCS football season. The Lions were led by third-year head coach Frank Scelfo and played their home games at Strawberry Stadium. They competed as a member of the Southland Conference. Although Southland institutions could have chosen to participate in limited fall competition, Southeastern Louisiana announced on August 13, that they would not compete in any athletic competitions in the fall.

Previous season
The Lions finished the 2019 season 8–5, 6–3 in Southland play to finish in a tie for third place.  The Lions were invited to the NCAA Division I Tournament where they were ultimately defeated in the second round after defeating No. 8 Villanova 45-44 and then lost to No. 7 Montana 73–28.

Preseason

Recruiting class
Reference:

|}

Preseason poll
The Southland Conference released their spring preseason poll in January 2021. The Lions were picked to finish third in the conference. In addition, six Lions were chosen to the Preseason All-Southland Team

Preseason All–Southland Teams

Offense

2nd Team
Matt DeBlasio – Tight End/Running Back, SR
Austin Mitchell – Wide Receiver, RS-SR
Drew Jones – Offensive Lineman, SR

Defense

1st Team
Alexis Ramos – Linebacker, SR
Ferlando Jordan – Defensive Back, RS-JR

2nd Team
Josh Carr Jr. – Defensive Lineman, JR

Roster

Schedule

Game summaries

at Sam Houston State

McNeese State

Northwestern State

at Incarnate Word

Lamar

at Nicholls

at Southern Illinois

References

Southeastern Louisiana
Southeastern Louisiana Lions football seasons
Southeastern Louisiana Lions football